The 2022 CONMEBOL Recopa Sudamericana was the 30th edition of the CONMEBOL Recopa Sudamericana (also referred to as the Recopa Sudamericana), the football competition organized by CONMEBOL between the winners of the previous season's two major South American club tournaments, the Copa Libertadores and the Copa Sudamericana.
 
The competition was contested in two-legged home-and-away format between Brazilian teams Palmeiras, the 2021 Copa Libertadores champions, and Athletico Paranaense, the 2021 Copa Sudamericana champions. The first leg was hosted by Athletico Paranaense on 23 February 2022 at Arena da Baixada in Curitiba, while the second leg was hosted by Palmeiras on 2 March 2022 at Allianz Parque in São Paulo.

Palmeiras defeated Athletico Paranaense 4–2 on aggregate to win their first Recopa Sudamericana title.

Teams

Format
The Recopa Sudamericana is played on a home-and-away two-legged basis, with the Copa Libertadores champions hosting the second leg. If tied on aggregate, the away goals rule would not be used, and 30 minutes of extra time would be played. If still tied after extra time, the penalty shoot-out would be used to determine the winners (Regulations Article 17).

Matches
Kawan, Matheus Babi, Matheus Felipe, Pedro Rocha and Reinaldo (Athletico Paranaense) and Gabriel Menino and Luan (Palmeiras) were ruled out of the matches due to injuries. Vitor Bueno (Athletico Paranaense) was not available due to suspension.

Pablo (Athletico Paranaense) and Gustavo Scarpa (Palmeiras) were ruled out of the first leg due to injuries. Julimar (Athletico Paranaense) and Gustavo Gómez (Palmeiras) did not play the first leg after testing COVID-19 positive. Marcinho (Athletico Paranaense), who committed the penalty into stoppage time during the first leg, was excluded of the team by the president Mario Celso Petraglia and was ruled out of the second leg.

First leg

Second leg

References

2022
2022 in South American football
2022 in Brazilian football
Recopa Sudamericana
Recopa Sudamericana
Sociedade Esportiva Palmeiras matches
Club Athletico Paranaense matches